John Francombe "Ian" Ure (born 7 December 1939) is a former Scottish football player and manager. Ure started his career with Dundee, before moving to England to play for Arsenal and Manchester United. After eight years in England, Ure returned to Scotland to play for St Mirren, however, after two seasons with the Paisley club and only three league appearances, Ure went into football management with East Stirlingshire. During his time with Dundee and Arsenal, Ure played on 12 occasions for the Scotland national team.

Career

Club
Ure started his career as a centre-half with Ayr Albion. In 1958, after being scouted by the Dens Park club, Ure signed for Dundee where he remained for five seasons. During that time, the club won its one and only First Division title in 1961–62, and reached the semi-finals of the European Cup in 1962–63, losing 5–2 on aggregate to eventual champions Milan. 

He moved south of the border in 1963 for a transfer fee of £62,500 to play for Arsenal. He only missed one match for Arsenal in his first season, but injury and a loss of form restricted his appearances in 1964–65 and 1965–66, although he still managed more than 20 matches each season. Ure was restored to the Arsenal line-up by Bertie Mee, however, and played 44 matches in 1966–67. Ure continued to feature regularly for Arsenal as the 1960s went on, but during this time made a couple of errors in big matches, exemplified by his mistake in the 1969 League Cup Final against Swindon Town, which allowed Roger Smart to score Swindon's opening goal; Swindon went on to win 3–1 after extra time.

Ure played 202 matches for Arsenal in defence over the course of six years, scoring two goals, and picking up two League Cup runners-up medals (1968 and 1969). He was famously involved in a number of clashes with Denis Law in the game against Manchester United in October 1967, that saw both players being sent off and subsequently receiving six-match bans. However, with Frank McLintock and Terry Neill competing for the centre half position, Ure found himself being squeezed out towards the end of that decade, and he left Arsenal in August 1969 to join Manchester United. The only major signing made by manager Wilf McGuinness, Ure spent two seasons at Manchester United before returning to Scotland to play for St Mirren.

After retiring from playing, he spent some time as a coach, including a spell as manager of East Stirlingshire, but later left the game completely, and was employed as a social worker in Kilmarnock.

International
During his time with Dundee, Ure won eight caps for Scotland. He made his debut international debut on 8 November 1961, in a 2–0 win against Wales. He made 12 appearances in total, with his last cap coming against Northern Ireland on 21 October 1967. One of his appearances was during a 1967 overseas tour that the Scottish Football Association decided in October 2021 to reclassify as a full international, which increased Ure's cap tally from 11 to 12.

Career statistics
Source

See also
List of Scotland national football team captains

References

General

External links

1939 births
Living people
Scottish footballers
Association football central defenders
Scotland international footballers
Arsenal F.C. players
Manchester United F.C. players
Dundee F.C. players
St Mirren F.C. players
Scottish football managers
East Stirlingshire F.C. managers
People educated at Ayr Academy
Scottish Football League players
English Football League players
Scottish Football League representative players
Scotland under-23 international footballers
Scottish Football League managers